Jablu (also Romanized as Jāblū; also known as Ḩāblū) is a village in Vilkij-e Markazi Rural District, Vilkij District, Namin County, Ardabil Province, Iran. At the 2006 census, its population was 263, in 55 families.

References 

Towns and villages in Namin County